Ernest Duret (1856 – 19 September 1926) was a New Zealand cricketer. He played first-class cricket for Otago and Wellington between 1886 and 1890.

Duret was born at Paris in France in 1856. He worked as an agent.

References

External links
 

1856 births
1926 deaths
New Zealand cricketers
Otago cricketers
Wellington cricketers
Sportspeople from Paris